John Evans Dailey (born December 7, 1972) is an American politician from the state of Florida. He is the mayor of Tallahassee, Florida, serving since November 19, 2018. Dailey previously served for twelve years on the Leon County Board of County Commissioners, representing northwestern Leon County, FL from 2006 to 2018.

Early life and education 
Dailey was born in Miami. He earned a Bachelor of Arts degree in political science from Florida State University, a Master of Public Administration from the Reubin O'D Askew School of Public Administration and Policy, and a Master of Urban and Regional Planning from the London School of Economics. During his time at LSE, he served as an aide to Roger Casale, a member of Parliament.

Career

Elections 

On September 5, 2006, Dailey was elected to the Leon County Board of County Commissioners for the third district. He served on the Leon County Commission for three terms, during which he served as chairman of the board twice (2010–2011 and 2016–2017).

On November 6, 2018, he defeated his challenger Dustin Daniels in a second-round runoff of the 2018 Tallahassee mayoral election with 51.47% of the vote to 48.53%.

During John Dailey's re-election campaign in the 2022 mayoral race, he accepted approximately $20,000 in campaign contributions from Seminole Booster and FSU related entities weeks before a critical vote awarding $20 million dollars in public funds for stadium improvements. On August 3, 2022, Dailey filed an elections complaint to the Florida Elections Commission against his opponent, Kristin Dozier, accusing of her mayoral campaign being driven by dark money. From there, Dailey pledged to "hold every candidate accountable to follow the law".

Dailey was re-elected in November 2022, defeating his General Election opponent Kristin Dozier by 6 points, 53.16% to 46.84%

Mayor of Tallahassee (2018–present) 
On November 19, 2018, Dailey succeeded Andrew Gillum as the mayor of Tallahassee after assuming office, where he outlined in writing "a next chapter for the city of Tallahassee."

During his first term as mayor, Dailey in early 2021 made Election Day a paid holiday for Tallahassee city employees, claiming the use of voter suppression in other states in which he insisted the move as chance for Tallahassee "to lead an effort to expand rights". He expanded the city's paid parental leave policy to include six weeks of paid parental leave to all new parents following the birth or adoption of a child. Dailey formed a Citizens Police Review Board and mobile app that allows citizens to record interactions with law enforcement. He also spearheaded the development of a mental health mobile response unit to create an alternative to police response to mental health emergencies.

Personal life 
Raised in Tallahassee, Dailey is the son of Sarah Ann Dailey, a schoolteacher, and the late Dr. J. Scott Dailey, a was a two-term member of the Leon County School Board.

Dailey lives in Tallahassee, Florida, with his wife, Virginia Dailey. They have two sons.

See also
Mayor of Tallahassee

References

External links

1972 births
Florida Democrats
Florida State University alumni
Living people
Mayors of Tallahassee, Florida